Tajik literature and its history is bound up with the standardisation of the Tajik language. Tajik literary centres include the cities of Bukhara and Samarkand, currently in present-day Uzbekistan but with a majority Tajik population and Balkh and Herat in Afghanistan. 

During the Soviet era, the principal literary output was socialist realism in nature. 

Three writers dominated the first generation of Soviet Tajik literature. Sadriddin Aini (1878-1954), a Jadidist writer and educator who turned communist, began as a poet but wrote primarily prose in the Soviet era. His works include three major novels dealing with social issues in the region and memoirs that depict life in the Bukhoro Khanate. Aini became the first president of Tajikistan's Academy of Sciences.

Abu'l-Qasem Lahuti (1887-1957; in Tajik, Abdulqosim Lohuti) was an Iranian poet who emigrated to the Soviet Union for political reasons and eventually settled in Tajikistan. He wrote both lyric poetry and "socialist realist" verse. Another poet, Mirzo Tursunzoda (1911-77), collected Tajik oral literature, wrote poetry of his own about social change in Tajikistan, and turned out various works on popular political themes of the moment. Since the generation that included those three writers, Tajikistan has produced numerous poets, novelists, short story writers, and playwrights.

Other writers of note during the Soviet period include Satim Ulugzade (1911-1997), Karim Hakim (1905-1942), Pairov Sulaimoni (1899-1933), Rozia Ozod (1893-1957), Aminjan Shokuhi (1923-??), Mohammad Jan Rahimi (1901-??), Bobo Yunas ((1885-1945)), Habibulo Nazarov (1907-??), Abdul Salem Dehati (1911-??), Baki Rahim Zadeh (1910-??), Rahim Jalil (1909-??), Jalal Ekrami (1909-??), Aminzadeh Mohiedin (1904-??), Juhari Zadeh Sohayli (1900-??), Faizollah Ansari (1931-??), Mirzo Ghafar (1929-??), Mir Shakar (1912-??), Mohiadin Farhat (1924-??) and Ahmad Danesh.

Notable writers 
Sadriddin Aini
Mirzo Abdulvohid Munzim
Pairav Sulaimoni
Abulqosim Lohuti
Sadri Ziyo
Sotym Ulughzoda 
Mirzo Tursunzoda
Laiq Sher-Ali
Bozor Sobir
Muhammadjon Shukurov
Sattor Tursun
Бободжон Гафуров

See also

Persian literature
Mercy-Man

References 
 Perry, J. R. (1996) "Tajik literature: Seventy years is longer than the millennium" in World Literature Today, Vol. 70 Issue 3, p. 571
 Library of Congress - Country Studies - Tajikistan

Iranic literature
Tajik language